

Wolf Ewert (31 July 1905 – 16 March 1994) was a German general in the Wehrmacht of Nazi Germany.  He was a recipient of the Knight's Cross of the Iron Cross.

Awards and decorations

 Knight's Cross of the Iron Cross on 18 July 1944 as Oberstleutnant and commander of Grenadier-Regiment 274

References

Citations

Bibliography

 

1905 births
1994 deaths
People from Stralsund
People from the Province of Pomerania
Major generals of the German Army (Wehrmacht)
Recipients of the Gold German Cross
Recipients of the Knight's Cross of the Iron Cross
German prisoners of war in World War II held by the United States
Military personnel from Mecklenburg-Western Pomerania